Abdelatif Hannachi is a Tunisian author, historian, and professor. He earned his doctorate at Tunis University, and is currently teaching at Manouba University.

Works
 Point of view of Bourguiba toward the union Arab difficulties, (1956-1970)
 The evaluation of Tunisian point of view toward Palestinian issue (1920-1955), 2006

References

1954 births
Living people
20th-century Tunisian historians
Academic staff of Manouba University
21st-century Tunisian historians